Funabashi Arena is an arena in Funabashi, Chiba, Japan. It is the home arena of the Chiba Jets Funabashi of the B.League, Japan's professional basketball league.

Facilities
Main arena -2,357.94m2 - 39m × 60.46m × 15m 
Sub arena - 839.12m2 -  24.50m × 34.25m × 12.50m
Babies playroom - 67.02m2
Swimming pool - 25m × 6 courses
Multi purpose room - 519.87m2
Table tennis room - 218.43m2
Archery field - 127.13m2
Training room - 388.48m2

References

Basketball venues in Japan
Chiba Jets Funabashi
Indoor arenas in Japan
Sports venues in Chiba Prefecture
Funabashi
Sports venues completed in 1993
1993 establishments in Japan